The Wessenden Valley is a moorland valley in the Dark Peak, immediately south of Marsden in West Yorkshire, England. The name Wessenden derives from Old English and means the 'valley with rock suitable for whetstones'.

The valley is in the Marsden Moor Estate and occupied by four reservoirs, namely Wessenden Head, Wessenden, Blakeley and Butterley, the largest. The Kirklees Way and Pennine Way long-distance footpaths follow the valley. The upper part of the valley near Wessenden Head is managed by the National Trust as part of the  Marsden Moor Estate.

Butterley Reservoir's spillway, the only one of its kind in England, was a Grade II Listed structure until Yorkshire Water renovated it using concrete after winning a case on appeal.

References

Valleys of England